Powerfin Propellers, is an American manufacturer of composite propellers for homebuilt, light-sport and ultralight aircraft, as well as wind power generation systems. The company headquarters is located in Hurricane, Utah, although it was formerly in El Campo, Texas and originated in Arlington, Washington.

Products

The company is noted for its use of the Clark Y airfoil, infinite blade angle adjustment, as well as for the very low rotating inertia of its designs, a key wear factor on lightweight engine gearboxes. The propeller blades are constructed of carbon fiber and aramid pre-preg cloth with a foam core, and cured in an autoclave. The company's Apex series of two- to five-bladed propeller hubs were CAD/CAM designed and are created on a Haas VF-4 CNC vertical milling station.

History
Founded by Stuart Gort, the company went out of business in 2009. It was acquired by powered parachute manufacturer Frederick Scheffel and production moved to Texas in late 2009 and then to Utah in 2012.

Applications

See also
List of aircraft propeller manufacturers

References

External links 

Aircraft propeller manufacturers
Aerospace companies of the United States